Alectryon diversifolius , commonly named scrub boonaree or holly bush, is a species of Australian small trees of the plant family Sapindaceae.

Description
Alectryon diversifolius grows as a shrub up to 4 m high, with simple leaves often clustered on short branchlets. Leaf shape is highly variable even on individual plants, ranging from oval to lanceolate to strongly serrated and holly-like.

Distribution and habitat
The species occurs in central and south-eastern Qld and north-eastern N.S.W. Usually growing in Brigalow scrub in dark clay.

Taxonomy
It was first described by Ferdinand von Mueller in 1858 as Heterodendrum diversifolius, but was moved to the genus, Alectryon by Sally T. Reynolds in 1987.

References

diversifolius
Flora of Queensland
Flora of New South Wales
Taxa named by Ferdinand von Mueller